Vadzim Henadzevich Makhneu or Vadim Makhnev ; born 21 December 1979) is a Belarusian flatwater canoeist who has competed since 2000. Competing in three Summer Olympics, he won four medals with a gold (K-4 1000 m: 2008), a silver (K-2 200m: 2012) and two bronzes (K-2 500 m: 2004, 2008).

Career 
In 2001 he was promoted to the senior K-4 boat and won his first senior medals at the European championships in Milan (K-4 500 m bronze and K-4 1000 m bronze). A year later the same crew went to the world championships in Seville and took the K-4 500 m silver medal.

In 2003, Makhneu formed a K-2 partnership with Raman Piatrushenka, moving to Mozyr to work under Piatrushenka's coach Vladimir Shantarovich. In their first season together the pair won the 500 m silver medal at the world championships in Gainesville, USA.

This decision was amply rewarded in 2005 when the Belarus K-4 500 m crew of Piatrushenka/Abalmasau/Turchyn/Makhneu were crowned first European and then world champions.

He would win nine more medals at the ICF Canoe Sprint World Championships with a bronze in 2006 (K-4 1000 m), two more in 2007 (K-2 200 m: gold, K-2 500 m: silver), and four golds in 2009 (K-2 200 m, K-2 500 m, K-4 200 m, K-4 1000 m), and in 2010, a gold (K-2 500 m) and a silver (K-4 1000 m).

In 2005 Makhneu secretly married Alina, a receptionist of the hotel he had lived in while training in Mozyr.

His father, Gennady, finished seventh for the Soviet Union in the K-4 1000 m event at the 1980 Summer Olympics in Moscow.

References
 Canoe09.ca profile

External links
 
 

1979 births
Belarusian male canoeists
Canoeists at the 2004 Summer Olympics
Canoeists at the 2008 Summer Olympics
Canoeists at the 2012 Summer Olympics
Living people
Olympic canoeists of Belarus
Olympic gold medalists for Belarus
Olympic bronze medalists for Belarus
Olympic medalists in canoeing
Olympic silver medalists for Belarus
ICF Canoe Sprint World Championships medalists in kayak
Medalists at the 2012 Summer Olympics
Medalists at the 2008 Summer Olympics
Medalists at the 2004 Summer Olympics
Sportspeople from Minsk
European Games competitors for Belarus
Canoeists at the 2015 European Games